Joaquín Oristrell Ventura (born 15 September 1953) is a Spanish film director and screenwriter.

Biography 
Born in Barcelona on 15 September 1953, he is the cousin of actress Yolanda Ventura and nephew of trumpeter .
He has written scripts to Manuel Gutiérrez Aragón, Fernando Colomo and others directors before his film debut in 1997 with (¿De qué se ríen las mujeres? United States: DVD title, What Makes Women Laugh?)

Selected filmography

Film

Television
Un, dos, tres... responda otra vez (1982) (script)
Cuéntame cómo pasó (2016-present) (script) 
Fugitiva (2018) (creator)
HIT (2020) (creator)
La última (2022) (creator)

References

External links
 

1958 births
Living people
People from Barcelona
Film directors from Catalonia
Spanish male screenwriters
21st-century Spanish screenwriters